Barret Eugene Hansen (born April 2, 1941), known professionally as Dr. Demento, is an American radio broadcaster and record collector specializing in novelty songs, comedy, and strange or unusual recordings dating from the early days of phonograph records to the present. Hansen created the Demento persona in 1970 while working at Pasadena, California, station KPCC-FM.  He played "Transfusion" by Nervous Norvus on the radio, and DJ "The Obscene" Steven Clean said that Hansen had to be "demented" to play it, and the name stuck.  His weekly show went into syndication in 1974 and was syndicated by the Westwood One Radio Network from 1978 to 1992. Broadcast syndication of the show ended on June 6, 2010, but the show continues to be produced weekly in an online version.

Hansen has a degree in ethnomusicology and has written magazine articles and liner notes on recording artists outside of the novelty genre. He is credited with introducing new generations of listeners to artists of the early and middle 20th century whom they might not have otherwise discovered, such as Harry McClintock, Spike Jones, Jimmy Durante, Benny Bell, Rusty Warren, Yogi Yorgesson, Nervous Norvus, Allan Sherman, Ray Stevens, Candy Candido, Stan Freberg, and Tom Lehrer, as well as helping to bring "Weird Al" Yankovic to national attention.

Early life 
Hansen was born in Minneapolis, Minnesota, the son of an amateur pianist. He claims to have started his vast record collection as early as age 12, when he found "that a local thrift store had thousands of old 78 RPM records for sale at 5 cents each." He attended Reed College in Portland, Oregon, where he was promoted to Program Director of KRRC in 1960 and General Manager in 1961. He wrote his senior thesis on Alban Berg's opera Wozzeck and Claude Debussy's opera Pelléas et Mélisande. He graduated in 1963, and later studied at UCLA, from which he earned a master's degree in folklore and ethnomusicology.

After earning his master's degree, he lived for two years "in a big house on a hill" in Topanga Canyon with members of the rock band Spirit.  He also served briefly as a roadie for Spirit, and for Canned Heat, before being hired as an A&R man, or talent scout, for Specialty Records. The Doctor began his weekly radio show while working for Specialty, and he later worked for Warner Bros. Records.  He was responsible for preparing many of the "Warner Brothers Loss Leaders"  compilation albums of rock music issued by Warner Bros. in the 1970s, which featured new artists and new material from established Warner Brothers Records artists. These were advertised on the inner sleeves of WB's current releases—and were only available by ordering direct from WB using a coupon printed on the record sleeve—and were priced at $1 per LP. Most of these releases were 2-LP sets, so they were priced at $2 at a time when a "double LP" typically carried a $9.98 list price. Using his real name of Barry Hansen, he also contributed many articles on rock music to magazines including Rolling Stone, Down Beat and Hit Parader, liner notes on various late-1960s and early 1970s albums, and in 1976 contributed the chapter on "Rhythm and Gospel" in The Rolling Stone Illustrated History of Rock & Roll.

Career

The Dr. Demento radio show 
Hansen created the persona of Dr. Demento in 1970 while working at KPCC (FM) in Pasadena, California.  The positive listener response to the offbeat novelties that Hansen included in his rock oldies show led to his eventually turning it into an all-novelty show.  At the end of 1971, he moved to KMET in Los Angeles.  From 1972 to 1983, he performed a four-hour live show on KMET. From about 1974 on, the local Los Angeles market was the full 4 hours and the nationally syndicated show was cut to 2 hours. The show became a two-hour live show on KLSX and, after that station converted to a talk-only format in 1995, moved again to KSCA, where it remained until that station changed to a Spanish-language format, in February 1997.

His weekly show went into national syndication in a two-hour all-novelty format in 1974, produced by his manager Larry Gordon of Gordon/Casady and during 1978–92 was syndicated by the Westwood One Radio Network.  The Westwood One period marked the height of the show's national popularity; it was carried in most major radio markets, airing mainly on FM rock stations, usually late on Sunday evenings.  The producer Westwood One assigned to work with Hansen from 1978 to 1982 was Lynnsey Guererro, a former track star from UCLA and Senior Producer at the company.  In 1982, he handed off the show to a new producer from San Diego, professional journalist Robert Young. It was under Young's guidance that the show gained in popularity, mainly due to his willingness to foster relationships with national media and with nationally known and up-and-coming artists, including John Mammoser, Judy Tenuta, Emo Philips, Pinkard and Bowden, Wally Wingert, and Mark Davis (Richard Cheese). Young accompanied Dr. Demento to Portland, Ore.; Dallas, Texas; New York City; San Diego; Montreal; Phoenix; and other cities to do live performances and PR Events, taking photos, setting up interviews and even 'running the board' at some of the live shows. He left the radio network in 1990 during a business downturn. In January 2014 Young released an e-book titled "Producing Demento," about his memories of working on the show.

From 1992 to 2000, the show was syndicated by On the Radio Broadcasting. Hansen, under the name "Talonian Productions," handled syndication himself from 2000 until discontinuing syndication in 2010 (Hansen revealed that he was the owner of Talonian when responding to significant criticism of the company in 2007; Talonian had no involvement in any other show than Dr. Demento).  Between the mid-1970s and the mid-1990s, Hansen continued to do live broadcasts on KMET and other Los Angeles area stations, in addition to his weekly taped syndicated show.  He also made occasional television appearances, on such shows as The Gong Show (on the 1988-89 revival), Bobby's World, The Simpsons, and on the Barnes and Barnes music video for "Fish Heads".

The syndicated radio show normally started with an hour of randomly chosen records and listener requests.  The second hour was normally mostly devoted to a specific theme (cars, sports, pets, romance, movies, etc.) with a final segment taken up by a "The Funny Five" countdown of the most requested songs. There were also shows devoted to holidays and seasonal events, with the most important being the Halloween and Christmas shows (Hansen produced multiple Christmas shows during the holiday season consisting solely of novelty Christmas music), because of the large number of novelty records those holidays have inspired. The final radio episode each year was the Funny 25, a countdown of the 25 most requested novelty songs that year (see below). For most of the syndicated show's history, Hansen produced 52 original weekly shows every year; repeat broadcasts were rare.

The program's opening theme is an instrumental version of "Pico and Sepulveda" recorded for the show by The Roto Rooter Good Time Christmas Band (during the early years on KMET, it had been “Sugar Blues” by Clyde McCoy). The same Los Angeles area group recorded some of the musical teasers used on the show, such as "It's time for number one...."  The other "countdown" intros come from "Barstow" by the American maverick composer Harry Partch. Hansen's opening line, "Wind up your radios," refers to the rare 78rpm novelty records from the days of wind-up phonographs that he has featured on the show, especially in its early years. The closing theme is "Cheerio, Cherry Lips, Cheerio," a 1929 vocal by Scrappy Lambert (recording under the name Gordon Wallace), which Hansen tells listeners he discovered in a thrift shop. The Doctor closes each show with "Stay Dement-ed!"

Whimsical Will (real name: William Simpson) produced a weekly "Demented News" for the show since the late 1980s.  He also has recorded fake comedy interviews "break-in" style, following Dickie Goodman, including "Hey Dickie" (1989), which is available on iTunes.

Starting in the late 1980s, the show began to lose affiliates, a victim of media consolidation and other changes in the radio industry that were pushing many alternative rock stations and individualistic broadcasters off the air. In 1992, Westwood One dropped the show which was immediately picked up by another syndicator, On the Radio Broadcasting. This allowed the syndicated show to air records which were popular on the local Los Angeles show, but Westwood One would not allow, such as "It's A Gas" by Alfred E. Neuman and "Moose Turd Pie" by Utah Phillips. It also allowed Whimsical Will's Demented News, a fixture of the local Los Angeles show, to also air on the national show.

In 2000, Hansen formed Talonian Productions to syndicate the show himself. According to Hansen, the show steadily lost advertisers, and as such, he had to restructure the distribution of the show from the usual barter system to a system in which stations paid a rights fee for the program (though he apparently made exceptions in some major markets, such as WLUP-FM in Chicago). He stated in October 2007 that "unless the show's financial situation changes soon, I will be unable to continue the show much longer." After approximately two and a half years, and no significant change in the show's financial situation, the Dr. Demento official website announced on June 6, 2010, that the show that aired that weekend would be the final broadcast in the terrestrial radio version; however, new episodes of the online streaming version would still continue to be produced for the foreseeable future, with new episodes posted every Saturday. In addition, according to the site, "...by special agreement and due to contractual considerations, a version of the internet show will be heard weekly on KACV-FM (in Amarillo, Texas), at least through the summer." The show was removed from KACV-FM in January 2011.

Online streaming 

Beginning in approximately 2006, The Dr. Demento Show began offering pay-per-show audio streaming at the show's official website. Large archives from 1992 to the present, as well as a few select archives from the early 1970s, are available, but most of the syndicated programs from 1978 to 1992 are not because the broadcast rights are currently in limbo (Dial Global and later Cumulus Media purchased Westwood One in the early 2010s, but spun off several of its music shows to Compass Media Networks; it's unknown whether the Dr. Demento syndicated archive was among the programs). Some live local shows which aired in Los Angeles from this period were added. As part of the contract between Dr. Demento and radio stations, radio stations were prohibited from streaming the program online. Several radio stations were forced to drop the program because of this policy, thus reducing Dr. Demento's affiliate count (at the end of the show's terrestrial run only six stations were carrying the show, versus over 100 at its peak), further exacerbating the show's financial problems and inability to sell advertising. Despite the show's terrestrial cancellation, new online episodes are expected to be produced for the foreseeable future. The show ended its terrestrial broadcast on a cliffhanger, with the last terrestrial broadcast devoted to songs involving the word "big" and the first post-terrestrial broadcast devoted to songs involving the word "little."

The online show follows a format similar to that of the terrestrial show; no longer being limited by a radio time slot or commercial breaks, the show usually exceeds two hours and may include "bonus tracks" at the end of the show.  The weekly "Funny Five" has been replaced by a monthly Top Ten in order to allow for more comprehensive special topic segments.  The new format, along with the ability to play records that previously would have been censored on the radio, has allowed Hansen to delve more deeply into his collection than was possible on the syndicated radio show.

Other media 

From 2003 to 2005, XM Satellite Radio aired a weekly "Best of Dr. Demento" show (featuring a mixture of old and new material) initially on the Special X channel and then on the 60s on 6, Deep Tracks, and Laugh USA channels.

He was interviewed in the 2005 documentary film about outsider musician Wild Man Fischer, titled Derailroaded: Inside The Mind Of Wild Man Fischer. In September 2007, Dr. Demento portrayed the role of Hippocrates on The Radio Adventures of Dr. Floyd.

In addition to his syndicated show, he still makes occasional guest appearances for other shows. Among his guest-hosting stints were for Montel Williams on the now-defunct Air America Media (despite the network's politically driven format, the guest stint followed his normal format of novelty music, specifically Halloween music, since the show aired on October 30, 2009, the day before Halloween) on Anything Anything with Rich Russo on Super Bowl Sunday in 2011 and 2013, and annually with classical music host Jim Svejda on New Year's Eve until Svejda retired in 2022.

In April 2013, Meep Morp Studios began seeking donations to fund a documentary named Under the Smogberry Trees: The True Story of Dr. Demento through Kickstarter.  Under the Smogberry Trees was meant to be a filmed history of “The Dr. Demento Show”, covering the lasting impact of funny music on popular culture, and including current interviews with Dementites connected to and/or inspired by the show.  The Kickstarter campaign ended successfully on May 4, 2013, with a total of $118,722 in donations from 1,764 backers. On September 27, 2016, Hansen announced he had terminated his support for Meep Morp's version of the film, was working on producing his own version of "Under the Smogberry Trees" with Devin Lucas as director, and forbade Meep Morp from continuing to use his name or likeness for their film. Meep Morp stated that, after the film had substantially been completed and the studio prepared to begin taping the interview portions with Hansen in July 2014, he abruptly refused the interview and issued a cease and desist order to the studio instead, stating that he and Talonian would be taking full control of the film and its profits. Neither version of the film has been released as of 2022.

Honors 
Dr. Demento has been inducted into both the Comedy Music Hall of Fame (in June 2005) and the National Radio Hall of Fame (in November 2009).  Dr. Demento was inducted into the Oregon Music Hall of Fame in 2014.

Personal life 

Hansen was married to Sue Hansen (née Sue Charles) from 1983 until her death on September 10, 2017. Their relationship was childless by choice. Sue was a former clerk and training officer at the Union Pacific railroad for 12 years. Hansen describes himself as "an armchair railfan", sometimes sampling his extensive collection of railroad-related songs on his show.

Hansen has a long time interest in the roots of rock 'n' roll in R&B and country music, and he has written about it in many magazine articles, liner notes to compilations and new recordings by a variety of artists, and two chapters on early R&B for The Rolling Stone Illustrated History of Rock & Roll. His shows and public appearances display an encyclopaedic knowledge of the history of recorded music in general, from the earliest Edison cylinder recordings onward.

His personal collection includes over 85,000 records.

Influence 

Dr. Demento may be best known for bringing parodist "Weird Al" Yankovic to national attention. In 1976, Hansen spoke at Yankovic's school where Yankovic gave a self-recorded tape of comedy songs and parodies to Hansen. The first song, "Belvedere Cruisin'" about the family station wagon, was featured on the show. Positive listener response encouraged Yankovic to record more parodies; Hansen then funded Yankovic's first EP, Another One Rides the Bus, which eventually led to a record deal and pop chart success in the 1980s and beyond. Hansen has appeared in a number of Weird Al's music videos as well as in Weird Al's movie UHF.

Other artists who attained widespread exposure after getting exposure on the Dr. Demento show include Barnes & Barnes ("Fish Heads"), Ogden Edsl ("Dead Puppies", "Kinko The Clown", "Daddy's Money", "Idi Amin Meets Eydie Gormé"), Larry "Wild Man" Fischer ("My Name Is Larry"), Larry Groce ("Junk Food Junkie", 1975) and Elmo and Patsy ("Grandma Got Run Over by a Reindeer", 1979). The show helped revive and maintain interest in novelty hits from the 1950s and 1960s that received scant airplay on mainstream pop or oldies radio stations, including "Alley Oop" by the Hollywood Argyles, "The Ballad of Irving" by Frank Gallop, "The Battle of Kookamonga" by Homer and Jethro,  "Monster Mash" by Bobby "Boris" Pickett, "Hello Muddah, Hello Faddah (A Letter from Camp)" by Allan Sherman, "I Want My Baby Back" by Jimmy Cross, and "They're Coming to Take Me Away, Ha-Haaa!" by Napoleon XIV. Hansen also revived interest in the double entendre songs of 1940s Borscht Belt comedian Benny Bell, especially Bell's signature tune, "Shaving Cream". He introduced a new generation to the manic big-band parodies of Spike Jones, the musical black humor of Tom Lehrer, and the many novelty records recorded by satirist Stan Freberg in the 1950s.

Another frequently featured artist was Frank Zappa, whom Hansen cited as a major influence on the show and who appeared several times as a guest. The tribute show following Zappa's 1993 death was the first time the entire two-hour show was devoted to a single artist.

Another of the show's highlights occurred in the late 1980s when the satire/parody/improv hard rock trio Spinal Tap came in for a visit. Christopher Guest, Michael McKean and Harry Shearer appeared in full costume and stayed in character for a three-hour visit. Similar "big moments" occurred in a visit from Screamin' Jay Hawkins ("I Put a Spell on You"), when the singer appeared in the studios in Culver City dressed in black cape, distributing explosive flash paper to great effect, and when Mel Brooks came in for an interview and was presented with an "absolutely HUGE" cheesecake from Canter's Deli on Fairfax Avenue.

Dr. Demento was parodied in an episode of Mr. Show with Bob and David as "Dr. Retarded: Novelty Record Collector and Chief Head of Surgery, Mass General" and is featured as an expert in songs about "paranormal monster parties".

Rainn Wilson plays Dr. Demento in the satirical biopic Weird: The Al Yankovic Story.

Discography 
A number of compilations have been released by Dr. Demento, including:
 Dr. Demento's Delights (1975)
 Dr. Demento's Dementia Royale (1980)
 Dr. Demento's Mementos (1982)
 Dr. Demento Presents the Greatest Novelty Records of All Time, Volume I: The 1940s (and Before) (1985)
 Dr. Demento Presents the Greatest Novelty Records of All Time, Volume II: The 1950s (1985)
 Dr. Demento Presents the Greatest Novelty Records of All Time, Volume III: The 1960s (1985)
 Dr. Demento Presents the Greatest Novelty Records of All Time, Volume IV: The 1970s (1985)
 Dr. Demento Presents the Greatest Novelty Records of All Time, Volume V: The 1980s (1985)
 Dr. Demento Presents the Greatest Novelty Records of All Time, Volume VI: Christmas (1985)
 Dr. Demento Presents the Greatest Novelty CD of All Time (1988)
 Dr. Demento Presents the Greatest Christmas Novelty CD of All Time (1989)
 Dr. Demento 20th Anniversary Collection (1991)
 Dr. Demento: Holidays In Dementia (1995)
 Dr. Demento's Country Corn (1995)
 Dr. Demento 25th Anniversary Collection (1996)
 Dr. Demento 2000! 30th Anniversary Collection (2001)
 Dr. Demento's Hits From Outer Space (2003)
 Dr. Demento Interviews, The (2013)
 Dr. Demento Covered in Punk (2018)
 First Century Dementia – The Oldest Novelty Records of All Time (2020)

The Demento Society released members-only demo compilations titled Dr. Demento's Basement Tapes yearly from 1991 to 2008.

In 2013, Meep Morp Studio put out a boxed set of all 17 of "Dr. Demento's Basement Tapes" to date.  The box set was limited to just 50 copies, available only by donating to the Kickstarter campaign for "Under the Smogberry Trees", the Dr. Demento documentary.  Each box was hand signed and numbered by Dr. Demento himself.

References

External links

 Official website
 Demented Music Database – official playlist archive and more
 "Under the Smogberry Trees: The Dr. Demento Story" website
 Dr. Demento Discography

 The Mad Music Archive – a fan-run, user-supported site with song and artist information
 TOP 100 (or so) DEMENTED HITS (from Funny 25’s) – updated annually
 Another Side of Dr. Demento: An Interview at Twenty-Four Hours

1941 births
Living people
American libertarians
American radio personalities
Radio personalities from Minneapolis
Reed College alumni
UCLA School of the Arts and Architecture alumni
American ethnomusicologists
Culture of Minneapolis
Record collectors